Sir Henry Morton Llewellyn, 3rd Baronet,  (18 July 1911 – 15 November 1999) was a British equestrian champion. He was born the second son of a colliery owner, Sir David Llewellyn, 1st Baronet.

Background 

A younger son, Llewellyn was second in line to inherit the baronetcy on the death of his father. He was educated at Oundle School and at Trinity College, Cambridge, before going into the army. He inherited the title on the death of his older brother, Sir Rhys Llewellyn, 2nd Baronet in 1978. His younger brother Sir David Llewellyn was a Conservative politician.

Early career 

He achieved some success as a show-jumping champion during the 1930s, and competed in the Grand National steeplechase, coming second in 1936.

World War II 

During World War II he saw action in Italy and after D Day in Normandy and served as a liaison officer to Field Marshal Montgomery, eventually rising to the rank of lieutenant colonel in the British Army. He was appointed Officer of the Order of the British Empire (OBE) in 1945 and Commander in 1953 for services to British International Show Jumping.

Olympic Gold Medal 

After the war he concentrated on show jumping, buying Foxhunter in 1947 after a long search. The duo were part of the British team that competed in the team event at the 1948 Summer Olympics, winning the bronze medal. They captured the public imagination for their role in winning Great Britain's only gold medal at the 1952 Summer Olympics, in the team jumping equestrian event.

Foxhunter and Llewellyn won 78 international competitions during their joint career. Llewellyn later served widely in the administration of British show jumping, and was knighted in 1977 before inheriting the Llewellyn Baronetcy upon the death of his brother. His business activities, following the nationalisation of the coal industry in 1947, included interests in brewing and television. Following the 1952 Olympic win he set up a chain of cafes called Foxhunter.

After Sir Harry's death, his ashes were scattered near Foxhunter's grave and memorial on the Blorenge mountain above Abergavenny.

Family and personal life 

Sir Harry Llewellyn lived at Llanfair Grange near Abergavenny in Monmouthshire. In 1990 he was inducted into the Welsh Sports Hall of Fame.

He was married to Christine Saumarez, a daughter of the 5th Baron de Saumarez. Their sons, Dai and Roddy, became well-known media personalities from the 1960s onward.

Notes

References 
 databaseOlympics.com
Kidd, Charles, Williamson, David (editors). Debrett's Peerage and Baronetage (1990 edition). New York: St Martin's Press, 1990,

External links
BBC article
  Biography of Sir Harry from Oundle School Society
  The Times Great British Olympians

1911 births
1999 deaths
Military personnel from Rhondda Cynon Taf
People educated at Oundle School
Alumni of Trinity College, Cambridge
British Yeomanry officers
British Army personnel of World War II
Welsh equestrians
Commanders of the Order of the British Empire
Equestrians at the 1948 Summer Olympics
Equestrians at the 1952 Summer Olympics
Olympic gold medallists for Great Britain
Olympic bronze medallists for Great Britain
Olympic equestrians of Great Britain
British male equestrians
British show jumping riders
Baronets in the Baronetage of the United Kingdom
Knights Bachelor
Sportspeople from Aberdare
Olympic medalists in equestrian
Medalists at the 1952 Summer Olympics
Medalists at the 1948 Summer Olympics
Welsh Olympic medallists